Sharif Ahmed (born 25 January 1970) is a Bangladesh Awami League politician and the incumbent Jatiya Sangsad member representing the Mymensingh-2 constituency. He has been serving as the State Minister of Fisheries and Livestock since February 2020.

Early life
Ahmed was born on 25 January 1970 in Mymensingh. He has a B.A. degree. His father Md. Shamsul Haque, was a former MP.

Career
Ahmed was elected to Parliament in 2014 from Mymensingh-2 as a Bangladesh Awami League candidate. Bangladesh Election Commission complained against him to the Prime Minister's Office and Parliament Speaker for threatening the commissions officers over a mayoral election on 20 January 2016.

References

Living people
1970 births
Awami League politicians
10th Jatiya Sangsad members
11th Jatiya Sangsad members
State Ministers of Housing and Public Works (Bangladesh)
State Ministers of Social Welfare